Agrani river originates near Balwadi (बलवडी) on Khanapur plateau (Khanapur tehsil of Sangli district). At origin, there is a small tree temple of great Agastya rishi (अगस्त्य ऋषी). After Vajrachounde (वज्रचौंडे) (Tasgaon tehsil), river turns and flows to Southeast direction.
In Sangli district, it travels for 62 km (Khanapur tehsil- 22.5 km; Tasgaon tehsil- 14 km; KM tehsil- 25.5 km), after which, in Karnataka near Athani village it finally joins the Krishna River.
Agrani is proved to be lifeline of draught prone Kavathe Mahankal tehsil.

The river has also been the subject of a major desilting project.

Agrani river rejuvenation project is being implemented under Jalyukt Shivar Abhiyan. This project is proving very effective in rejuvenating the lost river at its origin.

References

Sangli district
Rivers of Maharashtra
Rivers of Karnataka